The Cupa României Final was the final match of the 2016–17 Cupa României, played between FC Voluntari and Astra Giurgiu. Voluntari won the match, 5–3 after penalties.

Match

External links
 Official site 

2017
2016–17 in Romanian football
FC Voluntari matches
FC Astra Giurgiu matches
Cupa Romaniei Final 2017